The Alliance for Financial Inclusion (AFI) is a policy leadership alliance owned and led by member central banks and financial regulatory institutions with the common objective of advancing financial inclusion at the country, regional and international levels. Its members include roughly 100 institutions, being central banks, financial regulatory institutions, and financial inclusion policymakers from nearly 90 developing and emerging economies.

AFI partners with regulators in advanced economies, international organizations and private sector leaders to drive practical solutions and facilitate the implementation of impactful policy changes through its cooperative model that embeds peer learning, knowledge exchange and peer transformation.

AFI was founded on the idea that a global knowledge exchange platform was key to expanding and improving financial inclusion policies. Over the years, the AFI network – with financial and in-kind contributions from its members, funding  from donors and support from partners – has invested deeply in this platform and is delivering tangible results.

It has been over a decade since AFI began its quest to address the global challenge of financial exclusion and, in that time, has witnessed tremendous achievements from its membership of central banks and financial regulators from emerging and developing countries to advance the financial inclusion agenda.

AFI connects, encourages and enables policymakers to build capacity and develop policy initiatives in areas of financial technology (fintech), consumer protection, microfinance, SME finance, gender inclusive finance, inclusive green finance and other general financial inclusion initiatives in Africa, Asia, Caribbean, Eastern Europe and Caucasus, Latin America, Middle East and Pacific Islands.

Each year, AFI holds its flagship event, Global Policy Forum (GPF), the world's largest financial inclusion gathering of policymakers.

AFI is headquartered in Kuala Lumpur, Malaysia, with regional offices in Africa and Latin America, and a representation office in Europe. The current executive director is Dr. Alfred Hannig, who has after preparing the initiative since 2006 held the post since 2009. The organization has three working languages: English, French and Spanish.

Impact 
Since 2009, AFI members have developed and implemented over 820 policy changes to enhance financial inclusion. The level of attribution accorded to AFI for policy and regulatory reforms by members is 60 percent. This resulted in over 634 million people being brought to formal financial system as a result of AFI activities.

Since 2016, members have attributed over 100 policies and regulations to AFI annually, an indication that the preparatory work going back many years is beginning to be realized.

Organization 
AFI's core mission is to empower policymakers to increase the access and usage of quality financial services for the underserved through the formulation, implementation and global advocacy of sustainable and inclusive policies.

AFI is the only existing member-based organization with a strong network of central banks and other financial regulatory institutions, that have a specific focus or sole mandate on financial inclusion to support empowerment of the poor and aid the attainment of Sustainable Development Goals (SDGs) through smart policies and regulations.

It was founded in 2009 by Bangko Sentral ng Pilipinas, Bank Indonesia, Bank of Thailand, Central Bank of Kenya and Comisión Nacional Bancaria y de Valores in close collaboration and with support from  the Bill & Melinda Gates Foundation and the  Deutsche Gesellschaft für Internationale Zusammenarbeit GmbH (GIZ), AFI was established with the goal of advancing the development of financial inclusion policy in developing and emerging economies.

In 2016, AFI became an independent, member-owned and member-based globally operating international organization under Malaysian law.

AFI uses a peer-to-peer learning model to connect, encourage and enable financial policymakers to interact and exchange knowledge on policy initiatives. AFI has pioneered knowledge exchange platforms among policymakers and stakeholders worldwide to build a more comprehensive knowledge base of financial inclusion. This has led to the formulation and implementation of effective policies by members institutions within their home jurisdictions.

AFI also operates the AFI Data Portal (ADP), a unique and integrated global database on financial inclusion policies, regulations and outcomes. Housing information sourced directly from policymakers and regulators, the ADP empowers countries to share their financial inclusion stories and formulate policies through on data while also facilitating the study and understanding of trends in financial inclusion. The portal is accessible online and publicly available.

AFI administers financial inclusion policy-related services, including capacity building, developing-developed country dialogue, grants, in-country implementation support, knowledge products, regional initiatives and working groups, global advocacy on financial inclusion

Since the first AFI GPF in 2009, the event has supported an environment of historic financial inclusion policy initiatives and declarations, including the Maya Declaration, the first global and measurable set of financial inclusion commitments by developing and emerging economies.

AFI Cooperation model 
AFI’s cooperation model was designed to fulfil the objectives of supporting members’ financial inclusion agenda. Putting members in the driving seat of agenda setting for financial inclusion policy, AFI’s unique cooperation model is  based on the following principles:   

 Effective governance with Board of Directors and management unit driven by values of transparency, accountability and flexibility
 Apolitical and non-bureaucratic
 Full ownership by members who lead and set the agenda for the network’s initiatives including Working Groups, Regional Initiatives and capacity building
 Equality, inclusiveness and equity
 Solid administrative and financial system with resources focused on operational and financial sustainability
 Meaningful and binding partnerships with like-minded institutions
 Permanence and agility
 Sustainability of AFI services and knowledge resources

History

Origins and until 2008 

In 2006, there was an emerging recognition that policies mattered when it came to financial inclusion. There is also a huge sentiment around the potential of digital financial services for increasing financial inclusion for the unbanked population of the world.

Dr. Hannig described the situation in 2006 as follows:

Through the Gates Foundation, Dr. Alfred Hannig and the Deutsche Gesellschaft für Internationale Zusammenarbeit (GIZ) team successfully received grants to kick-off the first phase of AFI in Bangkok, Thailand and subsequently launched it in Kenya in 2009.

2009 to 2010 

Less than two years after its launch, AFI went from an initial founding core group of five member institutions to members in more than 60 countries, representing nearly 70 percent of the world’s unbanked population.

In 2009, the network saw the first AFI GPF, which was held in Nairobi, Kenya under the theme, A marketplace of ideas. Grants to selected member institutions were introduced.

In 2010, the Group of 20 (G20) nominated AFI as one of three implementing partners for the G20 Global Partnership for Financial Inclusion (GPFI). In this role, AFI brings innovative policies for increasing access to financial services from developing countries to the wider G20 forum and facilitates the participation of non-G20 policymakers in developing and emerging economies participate in GPFI work.

2011 Maya Declaration 

At the 2011 GPF in Mexico’s Riviera Maya, AFI members collectively adopted the Maya Declaration, a global initiative for responsible and sustainable financial inclusion that aims to reduce poverty and ensure financial stability for the benefit of all. It is a statement of common principles regarding the development of financial inclusion policy.

More than 30 countries represented by AFI member institutions, went a step further by announcing specific and measurable commitments. As of October 2021, AFI member institutions have made a total of 885 Maya Declarations targets.

The Maya Declaration has paved the way for various other accords. In recognition of these developments, both the G20 and the Group of 24 (G24) highlighted the AFI learning model and the Maya Declaration as key steps toward global economic development, with the G20 urging its members to commit to the Maya Declaration.

2013 to 2018 

In 2013, AFI members adopted the Sasana Accord on Evidence- and Data-based Results, Accelerated Progress and Measurement of Impact. During the same year, AFI reached 100 member institutions overall with the addition of the Central Bank of Trinidad and Tobago

In 2015, AFI members endorsed the Maputo Accord, which commits members to support access to finance for small and medium enterprises. It also established its headquarters in Kuala Lumpur, Malaysia, which are hosted by Bank Negara Malaysia.

In 2016, AFI completed the final steps in its evolution from an exclusively donor-funded project into an independent and member-supported international network of policymakers. Members also endorsed the Denarau Action Plan for Gender Inclusive Finance to increase women's access to quality and affordable financial services globally — bridging the financial inclusion gender gap.

In 2017, AFI members adopted the Sharm El Sheikh Accord on Financial Inclusion, Climate Change and Green Finance.

In 2018, AFI set up its Africa Regional Office in Abidjan, Côte d'Ivoire, co-hosted by the country’s Ministres de l'Économie et des Finances and Banque Centrale des États de l'Afrique de l'Ouest (BCEAO). That same year, AFI also celebrated its 10th anniversary at its GPF in Sochi, Russia. During the event, members endorsed the Sochi Accord on FinTech for Financial Inclusion.

In 2019, a letter of understanding was signed between AFI and the Ministry of Finance of the Grand Duchy of Luxembourg to launch a new multi-donor collaboration framework to bolster financial inclusion across the African continent. Minister Pierre Gramegna signed the multilateral letter of undertaking, together with AFI Executive Director Dr. Hannig. The cooperation is rooted in the support toward the advancement of the Sustainable Development Goals.

2019 onwards: COVID-19 pandemic and AFI's response 
The COVID-19 pandemic triggered widespread unemployment and falling levels of gross domestic product and disproportionately impacting the most disadvantaged segments of populations. This led to the implementation of AFI’s COVID-19 Policy Response, which aimed to systematically deliver coordinated policy responses to help AFI members mitigate the impact of COVID-19 on financial inclusion policy implementation, especially for micro, small and medium enterprises (MSMEs), women, youth, forcibly displaced and other vulnerable segments of the population.

Virtual engagements were conducted during the lockdown period with technical teams and leadership across its member countries to address specific issues. A series of member needs surveys were distributed to enable AFI to deploy rapid policy response guidelines.

AFI partnered with the Mastercard Foundation to implement a two-year COVID-19 Policy Response program in Africa. The program targeted 49 financial sector regulators and policymaking institutions across the region to effectively respond to the economic consequences of the pandemic. In-country implementation activities were conducted specifically in Nigeria, Uganda, Rwanda, Senegal, Ghana and the BCEAO member jurisdictions.

Responding to global trends, Dr. Hannig described in 2021 a recent evolution in financial inclusion:

“Financial inclusion is no longer just about access to finance and bringing unreached groups into access to formal financial services. [It] is becoming more about maintaining high levels of safe and sound financial access, with increasing usage and quality of financial services … embracing important issues such as financial health and financial resilience, with the ultimate objective to ensure financial stability” – Dr. Alfred Hannig, AFI Executive Director

Working groups 
AFI has seven working groups. They serve as the technical backbone for generating knowledge, guiding and implementing policies, and developing policies. The working groups produce policy guidelines and tools for formulating financial inclusion policies, provide peer reviews, and contribute to the engagement of global standard-setting bodies (SSBs). They also all work on gender inclusive finance as a cross thematic area and have gender focal points.

Since the first meeting was held in 2010, working groups have grown rapidly in size and number. As of March 2022, 76 member institutions from 65 developing and emerging countries participate in working groups. They represent the leaders of financial inclusion policy and, together, have passed over 520 policy changes in their respective jurisdictions.

They also represent the thematic areas that AFI actively participates in:

 Consumer Empowerment and Market Conduct (CEMC)

Examines the importance of consumer empowerment and protection to improve the quality of financial services. CEMC Working Group also advances policy and regulatory issues related to consumer empowerment initiatives and market conduct regulations.

 Digital Financial Services (DFS)

Discusses issues related to digital financial services and promotes digital finance as a major catalyst in achieving financial inclusion in emerging and developing economies. The working group also develops policy guidelines, conducts peer reviews and engages the fintech industry and global SSBs.

 Financial Inclusion Data (FID)

Builds knowledge and good practices on areas related to financial inclusion measurements, such as indicators, methodologies, global standards and principles.

 Financial Inclusion Strategy (FIS)

Promotes the development, implementation, and monitory and evaluation of national financial inclusion strategies.

 Global Standards Proportionality (GSP)

Provides technical support on the proportionate application of global standards while supporting, exchanging and discussing measures that strengthen and balance both financial sector stability and integrity.

 Inclusive Green Finance (IGF)

Discusses and creates financial policies that build resilience to mitigate and adapt to the effects of climate change, and to facilitate a just transition towards a low carbon economy.

 SME Finance (SMEF)

Promotes the discussion and implementation of smart policies that facilitate the access of MSMEs to finance and provides a platform for members to discuss related challenges and opportunities.

In addition, AFI working groups cover current and emerging global trends that have the potential for widespread impact. Member institutions have significant interest in developing policies that mitigate the challenges posed by the following policy areas:
 Forcibly displaced persons
 Gender inclusive finance
 Inclusive fintech
 Youth financial inclusion

Regional Initiatives 
Regional initiatives bring AFI closer to its members and strengthen regional cooperation in financial inclusion. They also enhance the network’s ability to support its members working on specific regional priorities, sharing regional knowledge and translating global financial inclusion issues into practical implementation at the regional and national level. The network has five key regional initiatives:

African Financial Inclusion Policy Initiative (AfPI)  
AfPI is the primary platform for AFI members in Africa to support and develop financial inclusion policies and regulatory frameworks, and to coordinate regional peer learning efforts. From AFI’s regional office in Abidjan, Côte d'Ivoire, AfPI brings together high-level representatives from African financial policymaking and regulatory institutions to enhance the implementation of innovative financial inclusion policies across the continent.

Key AfPI initiatives include leaders’ roundtables, private-public dialogues, capacity building workshops, developed-developing country dialogues and meetings of its experts’ group on financial inclusion policy.

As of 2021, 39 AFI member institutions from 37 countries participate in AfPI. Together, they have implemented 251 policy changes that can be attributed to the regional initiative’s work in financial inclusion. They have also published 15 knowledge products and 331 Maya Declaration commitments.

Eastern Europe & Central Asia Policy Initiative (ECAPI)  
Launched at the 2018 AFI GPF in Sochi, Russia, ECAPI aims to resolve regional challenges and elevate the voice of Eastern European and Central Asian nations on key financial inclusion policy issues. Countries within the region require focused and tailored solutions to tackle its financial inclusion challenges, including low levels of financial literacy, high volume of remittances and underdeveloped consumer protection policies.

While the region has witnessed significant advancements in financial access in recent years, at least 121 million people remain excluded from formal banking. Through the activities implemented in ECAPI, members aim to:
         Increase access to financial services for the 50 percent unbanked youth.
         Address the regional six percent gender gap.
         Reduce the 25 percent gap in access between those with lower and higher levels of education.
         Focus on advancing financial inclusion for the poorest 40 percent of the population.

As of 2021, seven AFI member institutions in seven countries collaborate under ECAPI. They have implemented 29 policy changes linked to the regional initiative’s work in financial inclusion, published four knowledge products and made 53 Maya Declaration commitments.

Financial Inclusion for the Arab Region Initiative (FIARI)  
FIARI is a regional platform created amid growing demand from member institutions for tailored solutions to regional financial inclusion issues. Launched by the Arab Monetary Fund, GIZ and AFI in 2017, and later joined by the World Bank, it aims to enhance access to financial services in the Arab region through effective coordination mechanisms and supporting the implementation of national financial inclusion policies.

As of 2021, FIARI comprises 22 AMF member institutions, including eight AFI members. Within the AFI network, members’ contributions has led to the implementation of 34 policy changes and 74 Maya Declaration commitments in the Arab Region.

Financial Inclusion Initiative for Latin America and the Caribbean (FILAC)  
FILAC is a regional initiative that aims to be the driving force for advancing financial inclusion in Latin American and Caribbean countries. It was launched in 2016 with support from Canada’s International Development Research Center.

As of 2021, FIARI’s 12 AFI members in 11 countries have implemented 99 policy changes and published 13 knowledge products. They have made 174 Maya Declaration commitments.

Pacific Islands Regional Initiative (PIRI)  
Officially launched in Dili, Timor-Leste, in 2015, PIRI aims to make formal financial services accessible to all Pacific Islanders through its unique model of south-south engagement and peer learning. The region has one of the highest rates of unbanked persons globally due to factors including geographically dispersed islands, small populations and limited banking infrastructure.

The initiative invites AFI member institutions to share in a common vision while working toward ensuring that financial services are widely accessed throughout the region. With PIRI, AFI has created a unique model of south-south engagement and peer learning that aims to provide all low-income Pacific Islanders with access to formal and informal financial services.

As of 2021, the regional initiative comprised eight AFI members in eight countries. Their work has contributed to 65 policy changes and led to the publication of eight knowledge products. Members have made 66 Maya Declaration commitments.

AFI Global Policy Forum 

The AFI Global Policy Forum (GPF) is organized annually by AFI and is the keystone event for its membership and financial inclusion policymakers globally.

The first GPF was co-hosted by the Central Bank of Kenya in September 2009 in Nairobi, Kenya, and attracted nearly 100 central bankers and other financial policymakers, providing a platform for policymakers in developing countries to engage in dialogue and share knowledge and experiences in expanding access to financial services.

In his opening remarks, Central Bank of Kenya Governor Prof. Njuguna Ndung'u summarized the goal of the GPF when he stated: "We will, over the next three days, share experiences on smart financial inclusion policies that have worked elsewhere. We will thereafter adopt these policies to suit our respective countries as we work together to push forward the global financial access frontiers."

Members

AFI's members consist of central banks, monetary authorities, and other financial institutions. AFI members are responsible for choosing the policies to focus on.

Donors and partners 
In 2016, AFI completed its transition from being an exclusively donor-funded project into an independent and member-supported international network of policymakers. However, AFI still continued to form strategic collaborations with a variety of global donors and partners from both the public and private sectors. These include:
French Development Agency (AFD)
German Federal Ministry of the Environment, Nature Conservation and Nuclear Safety (BMU)
German Federal Ministry of Economic Cooperation and Development (BMZ)
Swedish International Development Agency (Sida)
UK Foreign, Commonwealth & Development Office
Luxembourg's Ministry of Finance
Luxembourg Ministry of Foreign and European Affairs
Bill & Melinda Gates Foundation
Flourish, part of the Omidyar Network
Mastercard Foundation

See also 
 Maya Declaration
 Global Policy Forum (GPF)
 Financial Inclusion
 Polylateral Development

References

External links 
 

Non-profit organisations based in Malaysia
International educational organizations
Microfinance organizations
Economic development organizations